Venadito might refer to:

, Spanish Navy ship
Juan Ruiz de Apodaca, 1st Count of Venadito, Spanish nobleman
Venadito Bravo, Mexican footballer